Domu (Dom) is a Papuan language of New Guinea.

External links 
 Open access materials on Domu are available through Paradisec, including the Arthur Capell collection (AC2) and the Tom Dutton collection (TD1)

References

Languages of Papua New Guinea
Mailuan languages